A New Concordance of the Bible (full title A New Concordance of the Bible: Thesaurus of the Language of the Bible, Hebrew and Aramaic, Roots, Words, Proper Names Phrases and Synonyms) by Avraham Even-Shoshan is a concordance of the Hebrew text of the Hebrew Bible, first published in 1977. The source text used is that of the Koren edition of 1958.

References 

 Avraham Even-Shoshan. A New Concordance of the Bible: Thesaurus of the Language of the Bible, Hebrew and Aramaic, Roots, Words, Proper Names Phrases and Synonyms. Board of Jewish Education (April 1, 1984) 

Bible concordances
Hebrew Bible studies
Books about the Bible